Casper Käll (born 26 November 2000) is a Swedish handball player for Lugi HF.

He represented Sweden at the 2018 European Men's U-18 Handball Championship and won a gold medal.

References

2000 births
Living people
Swedish male handball players
Lugi HF players
Sportspeople from Lund
21st-century Swedish people